Alfie Henry Harman Doughty (born 21 December 1999) is an English professional footballer who plays as a midfielder for Luton Town.

Career

Charlton Athletic
Doughty joined the Charlton Athletic Academy at the age of eight and progressed through the youth teams to the first team where he made his debut in the EFL Cup against Milton Keynes Dons on 14 August 2018.

On 19 October 2018, Doughty joined Kingstonian on loan until 17 November 2018. Doughty scored two goals for Kingstonian on his league debut for the club against Harlow Town. In total Doughty made 16 first team appearances for Kingstonian - 13 in the league - scoring four goals, three of which came in league matches. On 7 September, Doughty joined Bromley on a one-month loan.

Doughty returned to first team action for Charlton against Forest Green Rovers in the first round of the EFL Cup on 13 August 2019 before breaking into the first team on a regular basis at the club later in the 2019–20 season. Doughty made 30 appearances for the Addicks as they suffered relegation from the Championship on the final day of the season. His performances during the season saw him voted as Charlton's young player of the year. Doughty started the 2020–21 season in good form but suffered a season ending hamstring injury on 24 October 2020 away at Northampton Town. In January 2021, Doughty turned down a new contract offer from Charlton following interest from Stoke City.

Stoke City
On 22 January 2021, Doughty moved to Stoke City for an undisclosed fee. Doughty returned from his injury in July 2021 and scored in a pre-season friendly against Hibernian. However he was unable to establish himself in Michael O'Neill's team and was limited to 11 league appearances all as a substitute. On 29 January 2022, Doughty joined Cardiff City loan on loan for the remainder of the 2021–22 season. Doughty made nine appearances for the Bluebirds, scoring once before his loan was cut short due to injury.

Luton Town
On 20 June 2022, Doughty joined Luton Town for an undisclosed fee.

Career statistics

Honours

Individual
Charlton Athletic Young Player of the Year: 2019–20

References

English footballers
1999 births
Living people
Association football midfielders
Charlton Athletic F.C. players
Kingstonian F.C. players
Bromley F.C. players
Stoke City F.C. players
Cardiff City F.C. players
Luton Town F.C. players
English Football League players
Isthmian League players
National League (English football) players
People from Poplar, London